Ramil Hasanov (born 15 February 1996 in AR Crimea, Ukraine) is a professional Ukrainian football striker who plays on loan for Rubin Yalta.

Career
Hasanov is a product of SC Tavriya youth sportive school system. He played in the Ukrainian Premier League Reserves for SC Tavriya and after dissolution of the club, in November 2014 signed 3 years contract with the Azerbaijani club Gabala FK.

In June 2017 he went on loan for one year in other Azerbaijan Premier League's club Sumgayit FK, but in December 2017 returned to his club.

Career statistics

Club

References

External links

 

1996 births
Living people
Ukrainian footballers
SC Tavriya Simferopol players
Ukrainian expatriate footballers
Expatriate footballers in Azerbaijan
Gabala FC players
Sumgayit FK players
Khazar Baku FK players
Azerbaijan Premier League players
Ukrainian expatriate sportspeople in Azerbaijan
Association football forwards